Siya is a rural locality (a settlement) and the administrative center of Siyskoye Rural Settlement of Pinezhsky District, Arkhangelsk Oblast, Russia. The population was 1,336 as of 2010. There are 6 streets.

Geography 
Siya is located 94 km west of Karpogory (the district's administrative centre) by road. Syloga is the nearest rural locality.

References 

Rural localities in Pinezhsky District